Mertondale or Mertondale Station is a pastoral lease, most recently operated as a cattle station, but previously run as a sheep station. Mertondale adjoins Nambi, Clover Downs and Tarmoola Stations.

The now abandoned town of Mertondale once stood within the station boundaries. The town was gazetted in 1899 following a gold discovery, but was abandoned in 1910.

Andrew McDonald retired from managing the property and left the area in 1950.

The property is run in conjunction with Clover Downs Station. They have a carrying capacity of 9,000 sheep and 1,300 cattle. Small areas of the station have been infested with the coral cactus, which had spread to Mertondale from neighbouring Tarmoola Station.

In 2020 the Department of Defence bought the station to protect the Jindalee Operational Radar Network against Chinese attention.

See also
List of ranches and stations

References

Pastoral leases in Western Australia
Goldfields-Esperance
Stations (Australian agriculture)